is a Japanese women's professional shogi player ranked 1-kyū.  she is the youngest active women's professional shogi player. She is also the first person from Shiga Prefecture to become a professional shogi player.

Early life and becoming a women's professional shogi player
Kimura was born in Takashima, Shiga on July 11, 2008. She became interested in shogi after watching her older brother play and father play when she was a first-grade elementary school student, and then learned how to play at a neighborhood club for senior citizens. She performed well in a number of shogi tournaments for elementary school students, and then won the girl's division of the 42nd  as a first-grade junior high school student in August 2021. She subsequently entered the Kansai branch of the Japan Shogi Association's training group system under the tutledge of shogi professional Kenji Kobayashi and qualified for women's professional status after being promoted to training group B2 in April 2022.  Kimura is the youngest active women's professional, and she is also the first professional shogi player, regular or women's, from Shiga Prefecture.

Promotion history
Kimura's promotion history is as follows.

 2-kyū: June 1, 2022
 1-kyū: January 26, 2023

Note: All ranks are women's professional ranks.

References

2008 births
Living people
Japanese shogi players
Women's professional shogi players
Professional shogi players from Shiga Prefecture